Stephanie Millward,  (born 20 September 1981) is a British Paralympic swimmer.

Personal life
Millward was born on 20 September 1981 in Jeddah, Saudi Arabia. At the age of 17 she was diagnosed with multiple sclerosis (MS). As a result, she competed in the S9 (classification) Paralympic classification. Since 12 June 2016, she competes in the S8 classification after her category change from the less impaired S9 category down to S8. She was reclassified at the Berlin Open.
She was awarded the Freedom of the Town of Corsham on 2 March 2013.

Education
Millward attended The Corsham School, Wiltshire.

Swimming
Millward was close to a place in the British international non-disabled team and, having broken the British record for the 100-metre backstroke at the age of 15, hoped to qualify for the 2000 Summer Olympics before she was diagnosed with MS.

She qualified for the 2008 Summer Paralympics held in Beijing, China where she entered four S9 events. She finished fourth in the 100-metre backstroke, fifth in the 100-metre freestyle, sixth in the 50-metre freestyle and thirteenth in the 100-metre butterfly.

In 2009 Millward won two medals at the British Disability Swimming Championships, taking a silver in the 100 freestyle and bronze in the 100-metre butterfly. At the International Paralympic Committee (IPC) European Swimming Championships held in Reykjavík, Iceland, she won three gold and two silver medals in individual events and added a further two gold medals in relays. At the 2009 IPC Swimming World Championships 25 m in Rio de Janeiro, Brazil she won two gold, three silver and a bronze in individual competitions and two gold medals in relay events.

At the 2010 IPC Swimming World Championships held in Eindhoven, the Netherlands, she won silver medals in the 100 m freestyle, the 400 m freestyle, the 100 m backstroke, the 4×100 m freestyle relay (34pts) and the 4×100 m medley relay (34pts). She also won a bronze medal in the 100 m butterfly. She represented England at the 2010 Commonwealth Games, where she won silver medals in the 100-metre butterfly S9 and the 100-metre freestyle S9 and a bronze medal in the 50-metre freestyle S9, finishing behind winner Natalie du Toit of South Africa on each occasion.

At the 2011 IPC European Championships in Berlin, Germany, Millward won three gold and two silver medals, including setting a world record time of four minutes, 52.40 seconds on the way to winning gold in the 4×100 m medley relay (34pts) alongside Heather Frederiksen, Claire Cashmore and Louise Watkin.

Millward was named as part of a 44-swimmer squad to compete for Great Britain at the 2012 Summer Paralympics in London, United Kingdom. At the Games she won her first Paralympic medal, a silver, in the 100 m backstroke S9. This was followed by four further medals. She won bronze in the 4 × 100  m freestyle relay (34pts), swimming with Cashmore, Watkin and Susie Rodgers; a silver in 400 m freestyle S9, finishing behind South African Natalie Du Toit; another silver came as she once again finished behind du Toit in the SM9 200 m individual medley in a new European record time of four minutes, 4.40 seconds. Her fifth and final medal came in the 100-metre medley relay (34 pts) swimming with Frederiksen, Cashmore and Watkin. The British quartet were in fourth place heading into the final leg but Watkin came through to finish in second place, three hundredths of a second behind the winning team from Australia.

At the 2016 Rio Paralympics, Millward won her first Paralympic gold medals, in the 100m backstroke S8 and the women's 4 x 100m medley relay 34pts. At the same Games, she won silver in the 200m individual medley SM8 and bronze in the 400m freestyle S8 and 100m freestyle S8.

She was appointed Member of the Order of the British Empire (MBE) in the 2017 New Year Honours for services to swimming.

References

External links
 
 
 
 

1981 births
Living people
English female swimmers
Paralympic swimmers of Great Britain
Paralympic gold medalists for Great Britain
Paralympic silver medalists for Great Britain
Paralympic bronze medalists for Great Britain
Medalists at the 2012 Summer Paralympics
Medalists at the 2016 Summer Paralympics
Swimmers at the 2008 Summer Paralympics
Swimmers at the 2012 Summer Paralympics
Swimmers at the 2016 Summer Paralympics
Commonwealth Games medallists in swimming
Commonwealth Games silver medallists for England
Commonwealth Games bronze medallists for England
Swimmers at the 2010 Commonwealth Games
S8-classified Paralympic swimmers
Members of the Order of the British Empire
Team Bath swimmers
Team Bath Paralympic athletes
Medalists at the World Para Swimming Championships
Medalists at the World Para Swimming European Championships
Paralympic medalists in swimming
People with multiple sclerosis
Sportspeople from Jeddah
British female backstroke swimmers
British female butterfly swimmers
British female medley swimmers
Medallists at the 2010 Commonwealth Games